Pierre Bastien (born 1953 in Paris) is a French musician, composer, and experimental musical instrument builder.

Life and career
Bastien began building mechanical-based musical instruments at an early age, using items such as metronomes, cymbals, and pulleys. In 1977, he began collaborating with Pascal Comelade and composing music for dance companies. He performed in ensembles such as Operation Rhino, Nu Creative Methods, and Effectifs de Profil.

In 1986, he formed his own orchestra, Mecanium, composed of Meccano machines which play various instruments, such as Chinese lute, Moroccan bendir, Javanese saron, koto, and violin. These machines were often driven by the rotation of old turntables. By the 1990s, Mecanium consisted of up to 80 machine 'musicians', and toured various art and music festivals, including events in Norway, Australia, Japan, Canada, Poland, and the United States.

Bastien has collaborated with artists such as Robert Wyatt, Jac Berrocal, Emmanuelle Parrenin, Jaki Liebezeit, Pierrick Sorin, Lukas Simonis and Issey Miyake. He has released material on record labels such as Lowlands, Rephlex, Tigersushi, and Alga Marghen. He has also completed a doctorate on 18th century French literature, his thesis being on pre-surrealist Raymond Roussel.

In 2001, Bastien released an album, Mecanoid, on Rephlex Records. In 2008, he released an album, Visions of Doing, on Western Vinyl. In 2014, he made installations with paper as the main sound source. In 2015, he came up with a new project called Silent motors, two frames with wheels and gears that are beamed on a screen with an overhead projector. In 2016 Bastien had a big exhibition of his mecanoids at November Music Festival in The Netherlands.

Discography
Albums
 Nu Jungle Dances (1978) 
 Le Marchand De Calicots (1981) 
 Superstitions (1984) 
 Hommage à Jean Raine (1988) 
 Mecanium (1988)
 Musiques Machinales (1993)
 Eggs Air Sister Steel (1996)
 Oblique Sessions (1997) 
 Mécanologie Portative (1998) 
 Neuf Jouets Optiques (1999) 
 Musiques Paralloïdres (1999)
 Mecanoid (2001)
 Musique Cyrillique (2001) 
 Mots d'Heures: Gousses, Rames (2002) 
 Pop (2005)
 Sé Verla al Revés (2005)
 Téléconcerts (2005)
 Les Premières Machines: 1968-1988 (2007)
 Visions of Doing (2008)
 Rag-Time Vol. 2 (2008) 
 Machinations (2012)
 Blue as an Orange (2015)
 Suspicious Moon (2022) 

EPs
 Boîte N°3 (1996)
 Boîte N°7 (2004)
 FTR003 (Split 12" with Anna Homler, Adrian Northover & Dave Tucker (TRIO) on First Terrace Records) (2018)

Singles
 XVII La Estrella (1993)
 Automatic Music (2010)
 Among the Skulls (2010)

References

Further reading

External links

 
 
 

Bastien, Pierre
Inventors of musical instruments
Living people
1953 births
Western Vinyl artists